Moorbach may refer to following rivers:

 Moorbach (Bever), of North Rhine-Westphalia, Germany, tributary of the Bever
 Moorbach (Werfener Bach), of North Rhine-Westphalia, Germany, tributary of the Werfener Bach